Iftikhar Shah (born 19 June 1940) is a Pakistani sprinter. He competed in the 100 metres at the 1960 Summer Olympics and the 1964 Summer Olympics.

References

1940 births
Living people
Athletes (track and field) at the 1960 Summer Olympics
Athletes (track and field) at the 1964 Summer Olympics
Pakistani male sprinters
Pakistani male long jumpers
Olympic athletes of Pakistan
Place of birth missing (living people)
20th-century Pakistani people